Godlevo is a village in Razlog Municipality, in Blagoevgrad Province, Bulgaria.
Godlevo is 12 kilometers from Bansko, 6 kilometers from Pirin Golf Country Club, 10 kilometers from Semkovo (ski center), and 140 kilometers from Sofia. Godlevo has its own stadium with capacity for 2000 people.

Hotels
Godlevo has three hotels: Pripetzite, K2 Hotel| and Assen House.

References
 Pripetzite
 K2 Hotel|
 Assen House
 Web 

Villages in Blagoevgrad Province